Spirtle Rock is a rock awash in the navigable passage between The Barchans and Anagram Islands, in the Argentine Islands. The descriptive name was recommended by United Kingdom Antarctic Place-Names Committee (UK-APC) in 1971.

"Spirtle" means "to cause to splash" in Scots (and in several languages also refers to a kitchen utensil specialized for stirring porridge during its process of boiling and thickening).

Rock formations of the Wilhelm Archipelago